Martín García (born 25 August 1998) is an Argentine professional footballer who plays as a right-back for Quilmes Atlético Club.

Career
García began his youth career with Sportivo Villegas, which preceded moves to Eclipse Villegas and, from 2012, Sarmiento. He was an unused substitute for the club's 2018–19 Primera B Nacional opener against Olimpo on 26 August 2018, prior to making his professional debut in the succeeding December during a 1–1 home draw with Gimnasia y Esgrima; featuring for the full duration at the Estadio Eva Perón.

Career statistics
.

References

External links

1998 births
Living people
Sportspeople from Buenos Aires Province
Argentine footballers
Association football defenders
Primera Nacional players
Club Atlético Sarmiento footballers
Estudiantes de Río Cuarto footballers